Oslo Gospel Choir is a Norwegian gospel choir centred in Oslo, Norway conducted by Tore W. Aas. The choir started up in 1988 and has since then become one of the most successful in Europe with success both in Europe and America. They have released around 20 albums. They are very much influenced by the American black gospel sound and Andraé Crouch is a major source of inspiration, with his approach in taking the gospel out of the churches and into other arenas, reaching a larger audience. Crouch has sung and been involved on several of their albums. The choir has sold over 1.5 million albums.

Has also sung with:
Morten Harket
Plácido Domingo
Calvin Bridges
Sigvart Dagsland
Tommy Körberg
Sissel Kyrkjebø
Albertina Walker
Ingelin Reigstad Norheim and Hildegunn Garnes Reigstad of the Garness duo
Delois Barrett Campbell of the Barrett Sisters
Mia Gundersen and Bjarte Hjelmeland
Maria Haukaas Storeng
Princess Märtha Louise of Norway has sung solo with them on two Christmas albums.

Discography

Albums
1990: Live (with Sissel Kyrkjebø) - Noah
1991: Get Together - Stageway Records
1992: In This House - Stageway Records
1994: Tusen Julelys - BMG Ariola
1994: The Christmas Way - BMG Ariola
1994: Get Up - BMG Ariola
1996: Gloria - BMG
1997: Live in Paris - Norske Gram
1998: Reaching Heaven - Master Music 
1998: Celebrate - Norske Gram
1998: Julenatt - Norske Gram
1999: Power - Norske Gram (with Calvin Bridges)
2000: Stilla natt - EMI/Norske Gram (Med Tommy Körberg)
2001: Live in Chicago - EMI/Norske Gram
2002: Det skjedde i de dager - Kirkelig Kulturverksted (with Princess Märtha Louise and Sigvart Dagsland)
2003: Salmeskatt - Kirkelig Kulturverksted
2004: JOY - Kirkelig Kulturverksted
2005: Lys i mørket - Kirkelig Kulturverksted (with Mia Gundersen and Bjarte Hjelmeland)
2005: We lift our hands - GMI Music
2006: We lift our hands - Part two - GMI Music
2006: This is the day - Live in Montreux
2009: This is Christmas
2011: Lys imot mørketida (with Maria Mittet)
2012: Above All (title of Scandinavia release) /  One true God  (title of European release)  /  Stay Amazed  (title of African release) featuring Loyiso Bala and Courtney Jonas
2012: Livets kilde - 12 Davidsalmer
2013: God Gave Me A Song
2014: I Go to the Rock

Singles

1994: "Se Ilden Lyse" / "Fire in your Heart" (with Sissel Kyrkjebø)
1994: "Fire in your Heart" (with Sissel Kyrkjebø and Plácido Domingo)
2006: "En stjerne skinner i natt"
2011: "En stjerne skinner i natt" (with Maria Haukaas Storeng)

External links
 

Norwegian choirs
Gospel music groups
Norwegian Christian musical groups
Musical groups established in 1988
1988 establishments in Norway
Musical groups from Oslo